H2O: Footprints in the Sand is a Japanese adult visual novel by Makura that was released on June 23, 2006 for Windows as a DVD; a version playable on the PlayStation 2 under the title H2O + followed on April 24, 2008 with adult content removed, but in its place will be additional scenarios and graphics not seen in the original release. H2O is Makura's first game; a sequel named Root After and Another was later produced in October 2007. The gameplay in H2O follows a plot line that offers pre-determined scenarios with courses of interaction, and focuses on the appeal of the three female main characters. There are two modes of gameplay, the Blindness Effect and Normal Effect, where the former plays on the fact that the protagonist is blind, and the latter mode removes the added element of gameplay the Blindness Effect has. The story is broken into three parts: the original introduction and meeting, following by a separation and reunion, and finally ending with the protagonist choosing one of the girls and spending the rest of the game with her.

A manga adaptation, drawn by Kira Inugami, was serialized in Kadokawa Shoten's Comp Ace between 2007 and 2008. A 12-episode anime by the animation studio Zexcs aired in Japan between January and March 2008 on the Fukui TV television network. Several music albums have also been released. The name H2O comes from the first letter of the three main heroines: Hayami, Hinata, and Otoha. Footprints in the Sand comes from a poem; the first part of this poem appeared in episode one of the anime and the second half in the final episode.

Gameplay

The gameplay requires almost no interaction from the player as nearly the entire duration of the game is spent on simply reading the text that will appear on the screen; this text represents either dialogue between the various characters, or the inner thoughts of the protagonist. There are three main plot lines that the player will have the chance to experience, one for each of the heroines in the story. The first time the game is played, only Hayami's plot line is available. After finishing Hayami's plot line once, the option to choose Hinata's plot line becomes available at the decision point in the early part of the game. Finishing Hinata's plot line will make Otoha's plot line available. The player must replay the game several times to view all three plot lines in their entirety. In contrast to visual novel adventure games where the text appears near the bottom of the screen leaving the rest of the window open for viewing the game's visual content, the text in H2O appears over the entire screen in a shaded, but otherwise transparent box. However, there is an option to hide the text in order to see the background without obstruction.

The game can be played in two modes, a Blindness Effect Mode or a Normal Effect Mode. The former takes into account that the protagonist is blind, and while he can imagine what the people he talks with look like, he cannot discern the color of the world around him, which renders the artwork in an almost black and white tone, additionally giving it a stylish and dream-like appearance. As gameplay progresses and the protagonist's condition gradually heals, this convention eventually fades away as the protagonist can now see with his own eyes the world around him. The Normal Effect Mode does not use the effect from the Blindness Effect Mode and therefore the visuals are otherwise unchanged from their originally colored state. The two modes can be interchanged at any moment throughout the gameplay.

There are three parts in the gameplay. The first part, entitled the  serves to set up the story and for the protagonist to meet and get to know the characters, especially the three heroines. Following the first part, there is a time where the protagonist must leave for several years only to come back in the so-called  and meet the girls he knew before who have changed somewhat. After the player chooses one of the girls, the third part in the story called the  concludes the game, which is also where the majority of the erotic content is viewable. The story consists primarily of the first two parts, which are a flashback from the protagonist's point of view. Within this flashback are around fifty smaller flashbacks from the past of the protagonist and the girls'. While the game is intended to be a serious drama, the gameplay is peppered with unrelated bouts of humor, which come with computer graphic artwork of the characters in a humorous situation depicted in a super deformed style. The pacing of the game is rather slow and tends to reuse the same flashback scenes. Additionally, certain flashbacks are viewable no matter which girls' scenario is pursued and these cannot be skipped.

There is an additional "emergency" button that can be activated if the player does not want other people to know they are playing an adult game. This option shows a random piece of artwork unrelated to the game's content out of around one-hundred images. These images are rather bizarre, one such image containing a black and white photograph of a toy horse head with red "blood" splattered around the edge of the image.

Plot

Story
H2O'''s story revolves around Takuma Hirose, a blind young male junior-high school student, though the cause for his blindness is undetermined. After his mother died unexpectedly, it left a deep emotional scar on him, which caused him to become very lonely and reserved. Due to this, Takuma and his uncle move from the city out into a rural area and Takuma is enrolled into a new junior-high school. At his new school, he meets several new girls, though three of whom he gets to know the most out of anyone else; the firm and obstinate Hayami Kohinata, the kind and obliging Hinata Kagura, and the cheerful and mysterious Otoha. As Takuma interacts with these girls, his medical condition gradually begins to heal and he fully recovers.

Characters

Takuma is the main protagonist of the story. He has a moderately quiet personality partly because he suffers from blindness and for his condition, he carries around a white cane he named , a pun on the word . His mother committed suicide, which left a deep emotional scar on Takuma. To rectify this, he moves to the countryside to live with his uncle . Takuma is naturally friendly and likes to befriend everyone he meets in his new town. There is a rift between the rich and the poor, with Takuma being on the former end of the divide. In the anime, he and Hayami fall in love. His mind reverts to that of a child after it is implied to him Hayami’s family killed his mom. He recovers slowly under Hayami’s care, due to his delusion causing him to view her as his mother. He later fully recovers and even regains his eyesight after coming to terms with his mother’s death.

Hayami is a girl in Takuma's class who sits next to him. She has an unsociable personality and a sharp attitude towards others, not wanting to become friends with others, due to her accepting her own status as an outcast. Hayami's family was rich once because her parents are doctors. Since they charged high prices in medical examinations and were unwilling to take any patients in without the fees, the village people revolted against them, burned their house and kicked them out of the village with the exception of Hayami. Without a home, she is poor and lives alone in an abandoned trolley on the outskirts of town, which was eventually burned down by the other adults out of hatred and later on moves in with Takuma and his uncle. 
She has an intense fear of spiders. Even though she owns a bathing suit, she will not participate in swimming classes because she is poor at it. Hotaru was once Hayami's best friend, but Hotaru broke off from her out of pressure from her grandfather. They eventually reconcile due to Takuma's efforts.
In the anime, Takuma and Hayami fall in love with each other.

Hinata is the granddaughter of the village headman and is one of the rich members of town. She is in Takuma's class and is the council president for her class. She has a kind of obliging personality, and is popular in her school. She is clumsy and tends to fall down, and once she even fell down a flight of stairs at school, though luckily Takuma was there to break her fall. She refers to Takuma as "Hirose-sama", a very polite form of expression. Her real name is actually , the younger sister to Hinata. When Hinata drowned, her grandfather forced Hotaru to become Hinata, and made the village people think that it was Hotaru that drowned. She is one of the several people-(along with her classmates) in the village that does not bully Hayami.

Otoha appears to be a normal girl, but she is in fact a spirit, and only Takuma can hear or see her. She is always cheerful, and will appear out of nowhere, clinging suddenly to Takuma. She refers to herself with the masculine pronoun , meaning "I". It is revealed that Otoha is the real Hinata Kagura, who fell into a river and drowned. She took the name Otoha from Hotaru's picture book that she drew herself. Before disappearing, Otoha shows Takuma a strange world, where she is his fiancée. Just before she disappears, she confesses her love for him, but says that she is not the one he belongs with. She eventually gets reincarnated as a five year old girl.

Yui is a girl in Takuma's class. She has a self-aggrandizing personality and always has two male henchmen tagging along. She is very rich and often uses formal speech so as to distinguish herself from the "commoners". She is very proud and condescending, but that does not actually mean she is unkind to others. In fact, she gets along quite well with Takuma and the others, with the sole exception of Hayami. Yui's grandfather died because they were poor back then, and Hayami's parents would not give him a medical examination without the fees. This led to the village's revolt against the Kohinata family, and Yui's hatred for Hayami. She often calls Hayami a "cockroach" and along with her henchmen will bully Hayami relentlessly. However, after coming to terms with her grief and Hayami's inability to change the past, Yui lets go of her animosity and learns to be patient and accepting with Hayami. She shows concern for Hayami and saves her from being killed by one of her henchmen in the anime.
She was given a scenario in H2O's sequel Root After and Another.

Hamaji is one of Takuma's classmates. Despite his feminine appearance and voice, he is in fact a boy who crossdresses like a girl. He has an optimistic personality, and likes to play innocent when he plays bad jokes on others. He has a little sister named , and his family owns a convenience store. He appears to be bisexual, and has flirted with Takuma occasionally, but ultimately marries his best friend . 
In the epilogue of the story, he has a child with Maki. Maki is seen holding the child at the Kagura household, who could have been mistaken to be Takuma's child due to the hairstyle, but the hair color belongs to Hamaji, therefore, making him the father. As an adult, Hamaji still crossdresses, and his feminine voice and appearance do not change.

Rin, like Takuma, is an exchange student from the city. She has a kind and gentle personality, and is a hard worker, but is rather clumsy. Rin is the main heroine in Makura's third game Sakura no Uta.

Development and releaseH2O: Footprints in the Sand was released as an adult game for the PC on June 23, 2006; an artbook came bundled with the game. A version for the PlayStation 2 entitled H2O + with adult content removed was released on April 24, 2008 by Kadokawa Shoten. The PS2 version contains new computer graphics and scenarios not seen in the original release.

Related media

Manga
A manga adaptation illustrated by Kira Inugami was serialized in Kadokawa Shoten's magazine Comp Ace between January 26, 2007 and February 26, 2008. Two tankōbon volumes were released: the first on December 26, 2007 and the second on March 26, 2008.

Anime

A 12-episode anime adaptation produced by Zexcs, directed by Hideki Tachibana, and written by Jukki Hanada aired in Japan between January 4 and March 21, 2008 on the Fukui TV television network. A preview video was streamed on Kadokawa Shoten's official website for their magazine Newtype on December 19, 2007. Most notably, the video contains an English narration, a rarity for Japanese trailers. The first episode of the series was previewed on December 23, 2007 in Akihabara, Japan, and the final episode was previewed on March 20, 2008, in Machida, Japan. The first episode opens with a partial recitation of the poem "Footprints", and the end of the poem is recited in the second half of the final episode. The anime was licensed for release in English by Kadokawa USA, but its Kadokawa Pictures USA subsidiary later closed down, therefore canceling the release.

Music
The game's opening theme is "H2O" and the ending theme is "Tomorrow", both sung by Monet. The maxi singles for the opening and ending themes were released at Comiket 70 on August 12, 2006. Two more theme songs used in the game were "Dream" and "Footprints in the Sand", also both sung by Monet. A character song album for Otoha entitled , sung by Mia Naruse, was released on October 22, 2006 at the DreamParty Tokyo convention. An arrange maxi single titled H2O: Prelude containing arranged versions of "H2O" and "Tomorrow", was released on December 21, 2007. The game's original soundtrack came bundled with the original game as a pre-order bonus. "Footprints in the Sand" by Monet is the ending theme in the anime's final episode.

Reception
Across the national ranking of bishōjo games in amount sold in Japan, H2O premiered at number two, and ranked in again the following ranking at number thirteen. H2O was the second highest selling game for the month of June 2006 on Getchu.com, just behind Summer Days, and for the first half of 2006 was the fourteenth highest selling game on the same website. H2O'' dropped to the twenty-fifth highest selling game on Getchu.com for the entire year of 2006.

References

External links
Official visual novel website 
H2O √after and another Complete Story Edition 
Regista's H2O + website 
Anime official website 

2006 video games
2007 manga
2008 Japanese television series endings
Anime television series based on video games
Bishōjo games
Cross-dressing in anime and manga
Cross-dressing in television
Cross-dressing in video games
Crossover video games
Eroge
Japan-exclusive video games
Kadokawa Shoten manga
Manga based on video games
PlayStation 2 games
School life in anime and manga
Seinen manga
Video games developed in Japan
Visual novels
Windows games
Zexcs